Evidence Makgopa (born 5 June 2000) is a South African soccer player who plays as a forward for South African Premier Division side Orlando Pirates and the South Africa national team. He represented the South Africa under-23 team at the 2020 Summer Olympics.

Early life
Makgopa was born in GaMampa, near Burgersfort in Limpopo. He attended Poo Secondary School.

Club career
Makgopa was scouted by Baroka in 2018, and was promoted to their first team from their development squad in January 2020. He made his debut for the club on 23 February 2020 in a 2–2 Nedbank Cup draw with Hungry Lions; Makgopa scored their second goal as they advanced to the next round of the competition after winning the penalty shoot-out. He made his league debut on 1 March 2020 in a 2–1 defeat to Bloemfontein Celtic, He scored his first league goals for the club the following week as he scored a brace in a 2–0 victory over Black Leopards. He made 11 appearances for Baroka in all competitions during the 2019–20 season, scoring 5 goals.

International career
On 8 June 2021, Makgopa made his debut for South Africa as a substitute against Uganda and scored a brace in a 3–2 win. He represented the South Africa under-23 team at the 2020 Summer Olympics, and scored once in 3 appearances.

References

Living people
2000 births
South African soccer players
People from Sekhukhune District Municipality
Sportspeople from Limpopo
Association football forwards
Baroka F.C. players
Orlando Pirates F.C. players
South African Premier Division players
South Africa international soccer players
Footballers at the 2020 Summer Olympics
Olympic soccer players of South Africa